The women's 60 metres hurdles event  at the 1993 IAAF World Indoor Championships was held on 14 March.

Medalists

Results

Heats
First 3 of each heat (Q) and next 4 fastest (q) qualified for the semifinals.

Semifinals
First 3 of each semifinal (Q) and the next 2 fastest (q) qualified for the final.

Final

Note: In the original final race (won by Graudyn), Michelle Freeman stumbled after the last hurdle and consequently impeded Julie Baumann. Freeman was disqualified and the race recalled. Baumann went on to win the rerun.

References

60
60 metres hurdles at the World Athletics Indoor Championships
1993 in women's athletics